The 2019 NC State Wolfpack football team represented North Carolina State University during the 2019 NCAA Division I FBS football season. The Wolfpack played their home games at Carter–Finley Stadium in Raleigh, North Carolina and competed in the Atlantic Division of the Atlantic Coast Conference. They were led by seventh-year head coach Dave Doeren. They finished the season 4–8, 1–7 in ACC play to finish in seventh place in the Atlantic Division.

Previous season
The Wolfpack finished the 2018 season 9–4, 5–3 in ACC play to finish in third place in the Atlantic Division. They received an invite to the Gator Bowl where they were defeated by Texas A&M 13–52.

Preseason

Preseason media poll
In the preseason ACC media poll, NC State was predicted to finish in fourth in the Atlantic Division.

Schedule
NC State announced its 2019 football schedule on January 16, 2019. The 2019 schedule will consist of seven home games and five away games in the regular season. The Wolfpack will host ACC foes Clemson, Louisville, North Carolina, and Syracuse, and will travel to Boston College, Florida State, Georgia Tech, and Wake Forest.

The Wolfpack will host three of the four non-conference opponents, Ball State from the Mid-American Conference, East Carolina from the American Athletic Conference and Western Carolina from Division I FCS and will travel to West Virginia from the Big 12.

Schedule Source:

Coaching staff

Roster

Roster Source:

Game summaries

East Carolina

Western Carolina

at West Virginia

Ball State

at Florida State

Syracuse

at Boston College

at Wake Forest

Clemson

Louisville

at Georgia Tech

North Carolina

Players drafted into the NFL

References

NC State
NC State Wolfpack football seasons
NC State Wolfpack football